Vitaliy Chenenkov (born 1938) is a retired Soviet swimmer who won a gold medal in the 4×100 m medley relay at the 1958 European Aquatics Championships. During his career he set one European (1958, 4×100 m medley) and three national records (1958–1959, 100 m and 200 butterfly).

References

1938 births
Living people
Russian male butterfly swimmers
Soviet male butterfly swimmers
European Aquatics Championships medalists in swimming
Sportspeople from Baku